PS Tilbury was a passenger vessel built for the London, Tilbury and Southend Railway in 1883.

History

PS Tilbury was built by J and K Smit, Kinderdijk, Rotterdam for the London, Tilbury and Southend Railway as a Gravesend–Tilbury Ferry. She was their first twin-screw vessel. She was launched in 1883. She was fitted with double action steering gear. On 21 September 1883 she underwent a trial trip.

She was acquired by the Midland Railway in 1912 and scrapped in 1922.

References

1883 ships
Passenger ships of the United Kingdom
Steamships of the United Kingdom
Ships built in the Netherlands
Ships of the Midland Railway
Ships of the London, Tilbury and Southend Railway